Niru, (born Nirmalan Nadarajah on 13 January 1980) is a Tamil music director and composer. He is renowned in Kollywood for both the sensuality of his melodies and the charisma of his work. From his rendition Netriunthom Engal Vitulilae with acclaimed tracks, such as "Pattu Selai", Niru has become a popular musician. He recently debuted in Tamil films as the music composer in the film Kalabha Kadhalan.

Biography
Having found a passion for music at an early age, Niru discovered an affinity to all things musical. Though greatly adept at playing instruments, Niru found his forté lay in composing his own music and directing the celebrated musicians of the world.

In 1989, Niru moved to Paris, France, where he was in the tutelage of the Maison Populaire. There, he ameliorated and fine tuned his precision and skill for manipulating melodies. Niru graduated from SAE (Paris) in 2001, a prestigious institute with the links to Oxford, UK. Niru then progressed to study Western classical music at the Trinity College of Music, London.

2001 onwards
Starting small, Niru initially began by composing jingles for advertisements, soon to be followed by a "nouvelle vague" which brought Tamil Pop to the forefront of music in France."Moongil Nila", album-extraordinaire and Niru's 3rd masterpiece encapsulated the vocal genius of P. Unnikrishnan, a good friend of Niru's, Hariharan, Srinivas, Anuradha Sriram, Karthik and Shankar Mahadevan. Celebrated lyricists Vairamuthu, Kapilan, Paa Vijay, Palanibharathi and Arivumathi were also able to successfully echo Niru's thoughts to great effect.

Niru then dedicated much of his time composing music for various charitable endeavours. In memory of the Asian tsunami of 2004, Niru composed “Kadala Kadal Amma” with the vocals of Tippu by Aruvumathy. Niru also composed for the National Red Cross. Niru became both an independent and critically acclaimed Music Director with the release of his debut film; “Kalabha Kadhalan” in 2005, the music for which was highly successful.

In 2006, Niru’s work, in Mayavi of GV Films, was nominated for the Seoul Drama Awards (SDA). Here, Niru gained the highly prestigious “Jury's Special Award”. The music for Rameswaram (film), also of Niru’s composing, was a great hit.

Filmography
 Kalabha Kadhalan (2005)
 Rameswaram (2007)

Audio albums
 Moongil Nila

External links
 Official web site

Tamil film score composers
1980 births
Living people